Fernando Suárez (born 6 March 1991) is a Paraguayan professional footballer who plays as a forward.

Clubs
 3 de Febrero 2011–2012
 Deportes Linares 2013

External links
 
 

1991 births
Living people
Paraguayan footballers
Association football forwards
Club Atlético 3 de Febrero players
Deportes Linares footballers
Segunda División Profesional de Chile players
Paraguayan expatriate footballers
Paraguayan expatriate sportspeople in Chile
Expatriate footballers in Chile